Tommy Smart (20 September 1896 – 10 June 1968) was an English footballer who played as a full back for Aston Villa. He made five appearances for England at international level, and also played for the Football League XI.

Smart was born in Blackheath, which was then in Staffordshire. He had four brothers and four sisters. He played schools football in the Rowley Regis area before joining Blackheath Town, and when his career was interrupted by the outbreak of the First World War, he played Army football. After the war, he played for Halesowen Town before signing for Football League First Division club Aston Villa in January 1920 for a £300.00 fee.

He soon established himself in Villa's first team, and made his debut for the England team against Scotland in 1921. The third of his five appearances, also against Scotland, was in the first match that England played at Wembley Stadium, on 12 April 1924.

Smart scored 8 goals from 408 Football League matches for Villa, and played another 46 matches in the FA Cup, including appearances on the winning side in the 1920 FA Cup Final and on the losing side in 1924. Only six players have played more times for the club.

In 1934 he moved on to Brierley Hill Alliance, and retired from football in 1936. He died in 1968.

References
General
 
 

Specific

1896 births
1968 deaths
Association football fullbacks
English footballers
England international footballers
Halesowen Town F.C. players
Aston Villa F.C. players
Brierley Hill Alliance F.C. players
English Football League players
English Football League representative players
FA Cup Final players